Déline Airport  is located  northwest of Deline, Northwest Territories, Canada. Caribou may be found on the runway. It played a role in the first episode of Arctic Air.

Airlines and destinations

Cargo

See also
Deline Water Aerodrome

References

External links
Page about this airport on COPA's Places to Fly airport directory

Certified airports in the Sahtu Region